In mathematics, Borwein's algorithm is an algorithm devised by Jonathan and Peter Borwein to calculate the value of . They devised several other algorithms. They published the book Pi and the AGM – A Study in Analytic Number Theory and Computational Complexity.

Ramanujan–Sato series

These two are examples of a Ramanujan–Sato series. The related Chudnovsky algorithm uses a discriminant with class number 1.

Class number 2 (1989)

Start by setting

Then

Each additional term of the partial sum yields approximately 25 digits.

Class number 4 (1993)

Start by setting

 

Then

 

Each additional term of the series yields approximately 50 digits.

Iterative algorithms

Quadratic convergence (1984)

Start by setting

Then iterate

The algorithm is not self-correcting; each iteration must be performed with the desired number of correct digits for 's final result.

Cubic convergence (1991)

Start by setting

Then iterate

Quartic convergence (1985)

Start by setting

Then iterate

 

Then ak converges quartically against ; that is, each iteration approximately quadruples the number of correct digits. The algorithm is not self-correcting; each iteration must be performed with the desired number of correct digits for 's final result.

One iteration of this algorithm is equivalent to two iterations of the Gauss–Legendre algorithm.
A proof of these algorithms can be found here:

Quintic convergence

Start by setting

where  is the golden ratio. Then iterate

Nonic convergence

Start by setting

Then iterate

See also
 Bailey–Borwein–Plouffe formula
 Chudnovsky algorithm
 Gauss–Legendre algorithm
 Ramanujan–Sato series

References

External links
 Pi Formulas from Wolfram MathWorld

Pi algorithms